The 2017–18 season was Bengaluru FC's fifth season as club since its establishment in 2013. This was club's first season in Indian Super League.

Background

In 2016–17 season Bengaluru FC got mixed results. Club failed to defend their league title, finished fourth in the I-League. The club did well in the Federation Cup, won their second cup title in four years by defeating Mohun Bagan 2–0 in final. Bengaluru FC finished the season well by advancing to AFC cup knock–out stage by beating Maziya S&RC in a must win game and keeping hope alive to better their previous seasons record in AFC Cup where Bengaluru FC finished runners–up.

On 11 May 2017, it was announced by the Indian Super League organizers, Football Sports Development, that they would be inviting bids for new teams to join the league for the upcoming season. 
Bengaluru FC had submitted a bid from Bengaluru. On 12 June, it was officially announced that Bengaluru FC (for Bengaluru) and Tata Group (for Jamshedpur) had won the bids for the new teams.

Transfers

Due to the Indian Super League regulation each club is allowed to retain a maximum of two Indian players over the age of twenty-one (21). On 30 June, Bengaluru FC announced they are retaining the captain Sunil Chhetri and Udanta Singh. Bengaluru FC also retained defenders John Johnson and Juanan. Goalkeeper Amrinder Singh parted ways with the club. He was retained by Mumbai City. Bengaluru FC announced signing of Australian midfielder Erik Paartalu on 5 July. Winger C.K. Vineeth switched the side. He joined Kerala Blasters. On 11 July Bengaluru FC announced signing of Spanish midfielder Dimas Delgado who last played for A-League side Western Sydney Wanderers. On 17 July Spanish winger Antonio Dovale was signed for a season. On 21 July, the club announced retention of under-22 players, defender Nishu Kumar, midfielder Malsawmzuala and striker Daniel Lalhlimpuia for a season.

In ISL draft held on 23 July 2017, Bengaluru FC retained goalkeepers Lalthuammawia Ralte and Calvin Abhishek, midfielders Lenny Rodrigues, Alwyn George and Harmanjot Khabra.
Bengaluru FC added eight new players from draft, goalkeeper Abhra Mondal, defenders Joyner Lourenco, Rahul Bheke, Subhasish Bose, Zohmingliana Ralte and Collin Abranches, midfielder Boithang Haokip and striker Thongkhosiem Haokip.

Eight players from Bengaluru FC were signed by other clubs in the draft. Goalkeeper Arindam Bhattacharya signed by Mumbai City. Defender Keegan Pereira, midfielders Eugeneson Lyngdoh and Shankar Sampingiraj were signed by Atlético de Kolkata. Defenders Rino Anto and Lalchhuan Mawia were signed by Kerala Blasters and Pune City respectively. Striker Seminlen Doungel and defender Gursimrat Singh were signed by NorthEast United.

Bengaluru FC announced signing of midfielders Bidyananda Singh and Robinson Singh for two years on 31 July. On 7 August the club announced signing of Spanish forward Braulio Nóbrega for a season. Bengaluru fc added their academy graduates defender Prashanth Kalinga and forward Leon Augustine to the squad for 2017 AFC Cup knockout rounds. On 17 August Bengaluru FC announced signing of India national football team goalkeeper Gurpreet Singh Sandhu from Norwegian side Stabæk FC for an undisclosed transfer amount.

On 29 August Bengaluru FC announced signing of Venezuelan international striker Miku for two years. The club announced signing of Spanish winger Edu García for one year on 3 September.

During winter transfer window, Bengaluru FC released injured striker Braulio Nóbrega and signed another Spaniard Daniel Segovia on 15 February 2018, in a short term deal till the end of the season. Bengaluru also agreed to the transfer for Edu García to China League One side Zhejiang Greentown for an estimated transfer fee for $150,000. In the process, Bengaluru FC became the first club receive a transfer fee from a foreign club. Bengaluru signed Spanish midfielder Víctor Pérez Alonso as a replacement on a short team deal for the rest of the season.

In

Out

Pre-season and friendlies
Bengaluru FC, having completed the squad selection at 2017–18 ISL Players Draft, arranged a 10-day pre-season training camp in Murcia, Spain before facing North Korean side April 25 Sports Club. During the tour, the blues were scheduled to face Segunda División B side UCAM Murcia CF and UAE Pro League side Baniyas Club in the friendlies. Later, a friendly against FC Cartagena was added as well. Bengaluru FC lost all three friendlies. During the AFC cup campaign, Bengaluru FC played India national under-19 football team and won with a solitary goal from Daniel Lalhlimpuia.

After the conclusion of 2017 AFC Cup and before 2017–18 Indian Super League season, Bengaluru FC played two games against the former I-League rivals East Bengal F.C., behind closed doors. The first game on 25 October 2017 ended in a draw with Surabuddin Mollick and Miku scoring a goal each for their respective teams. Bengaluru FC won the second friendly 3–1. Udanta Singh scored a brace, whereas Miku scored the third goal. Bengaluru FC then played two friendlies against I-League debutant, Gokulam FC, winning both games 2–0 and 3–1, respectively. Before the international break, Bengaluru FC played two more friendlies with Chennai City F.C., drawing the first 2–2, and winning the second friendly 6–1. In the final friendly before ISL, Bengaluru FC played yet another I-League side Minerva Punjab F.C., and lost the game 2–3.

Competitions

Indian Super League

Summary

November

Bengaluru made their ISL debut against Mumbai City on 19 November 2017 at the Sree Kanteerava Stadium in Bengaluru. Roca handed starts to new foreign signings, Edu García and Miku. Despite wonderful link up play between the forward duo of Chhetri and Miku, the hosts lacked finishing in the final third in the first half. There was hardly any opportunities created by Mumbai themselves as they chose to sit deep and Bengaluru dominated the game. In the second half, Bengaluru scored their first goal in ISL, courtesy a short corner routine, when Edu Garcia drilled one past former BFC man Amrinder Singh at the near post at the 67th minute. A defensive mix up in added time meant that Chhetri could get his name on the scoresheet and sealed a 2–0 victory for the blues. Bengaluru continued the form against Delhi Dynamos, whom they defeated 4–1 with Erik Paartalu scoring a brace and Miku scoring his first goal for the club. However, they conceded a penalty late in the second half when John Johnson was adjudged to have a handball inside the penalty area. Bengaluru played their first away game of the season against FC Goa on 30 November 2017. In the action packed first half, Gurpreet Singh Sandhu was sent off and Bengaluru conceded three goals. With the team down to 10-men, Bengaluru managed to equalize score with Miku's brace at 3–3, but once Goa took the lead with Coro's hat-trick in 63rd minute, Bengaluru could not find an equalizer and tasted the first defeat of the season.

December
Bengaluru FC kicked off the month of December with an away game against NorthEast United on 8 December. Bengaluru FC made multiple changes, including bringing in Lalthuammawia Ralte to replace Gurpreet Singh Sandhu, who was suspended for 2 games. Miku scored the only goal of the match to ensure the first away win of the season for Bengaluru FC. Bengaluru played third consecutive away game against FC Pune City on 14 December. Facing the crowded schedule ahead, Bengaluru FC chose to start without John Johnson and Edu García. After lack of clear chances initially, Pune City took the lead from Adil Khan's header. However, after Pune City's Baljit Sahni was sent-off after second yellow card, Bengaluru FC made the best of the situation and scored 3 goals in the second half with Miku scoring a brace and Sunil Chhetri scoring the final goal of the game in stoppage time. Bengaluru FC returned home against Chennaiyin on 17 December 2017. Chennaiyin's stubborn defence contained Bengaluru FC attack and inflicted 1–2 defeat on the home team, with Sunil Chhetri scoring the only goal for Bengaluru. Playing against the fellow debutant Jamshedpur FC, Bengaluru conceded the late penalty to lose the game 0–1. In a highly anticipated match, Bengaluru FC faced Kerala Blasters on the New Year's Eve. The first half remained goalless in the first half, but Bengaluru FC took the lead with Sunil Chhetri's penalty in the second half. The stoppage time saw a flurry of goals, including a brace from Miku and Bengaluru won the game 1–3.

January
Bengaluru played the first game of 2018 at home against ATK on 7 January 2017 and won it 1–0 courtesy a goal from Sunil Chhetri in first half. With upcoming fixtures of 2018 AFC Cup, Bengaluru FC rotated the squad against bottom-placed Delhi Dynamos FC. However, the rotation did not work out as Bengaluru faced 2–0 defeat away from home. Still on the road, Bengaluru faced Mumbai City FC on 18 January 2018. Sunil Chhetri scored a brace against his former team and with a goal from Miku, Bengaluru registered a comfortable 3–1 win and climbed back to the top of the table. Bengaluru secured another win at home against the highlanders, NorthEast United FC in the final game of January. Juanan and Sunil Chhetri scored a goal in each half to secure 3 points for the home team.

February
Once again Bengaluru FC started month playing ATK, this time an away match. Bengaluru won the match 0–2. Jordi Figueras Montel scored an own goal to give Bengaluru lead in 3rd minute. At 69th minute Bengaluru reduced ten men, when Rahul Bheke received second yellow of the match and sent off. Miku scored second goal of the match at 83rd minute to keep Bengaluru FC top of the table. In top of the table clash, Bengaluru FC next played Chennaiyin FC away 6 February. Boithang Haokip gave the team an early lead, while Miku and Sunil Chhetri scored the goals in the second half to earn a decisive 3–1 victory in the South India derby and a lead of 7 points at the top. Bengaluru continued the winning run against FC Goa at home on 9 February 2018. Edu García secured the lead in the first half while Dimas Delgado scored his first goal for the team and sealed the game 2–0 in the second half, extending the team's winning streak to five games. With the win, Bengaluru FC also became the first team to confirm their spot in the semi-finals. In another top of the table clash, Bengaluru FC faced FC Pune City at home on 16 February 2018. After conceding a goal in the first half, Bengaluru equalized with Miku's goal in the second half. Bengaluru were denied a clear penalty opportunity in the dying minutes of the game and settled for their first draw of the season in Indian Super League. In the last away game of the season, Bengaluru FC faced Jamshedpur FC on 25 February 2018. Miku and Sunil Chhetri secured lead in the first half with a goal each and Gurpreet Singh Sandhu made crucial saves in the second half to earn a clean sheet and secured 2–0 win. With the win, Bengaluru FC also secured the top spot for the league stage.

March

In the final game of the league stage, Bengaluru faced southern rivals Kerala Blasters at the home on 1 March 2018. The game remained deadlocked until Miku and Udanta Singh scored two goals in injury time to finish the league stage with a win.

Bengaluru FC faced 4th placed FC Pune City in the semi-finals. Playing the first leg at away, Bengaluru had to settle for a goal-less draw. In the return leg played at home, Bengaluru FC defeated Pune City 3–1 to enter final in their debut ISL season. Captain Sunil Chhetri scored his first hat-trick for Bengaluru FC. Jonatan Lucca scored the lone goal for Pune City.

Bengaluru FC faced Chennaiyin FC in the final, played at Bengaluru FC's home Sree Kanteerava Stadium. Owing to Subhasish Bose's suspension, Bengaluru opted to play three at the back with John Johnson, Erik Paartalu and Juanan playing in the defence and Rahul Bheke and Boithang Haokip playing as wing backs. Bengaluru took an early lead with Sunil Chhetri scoring a header from Udanta Singh's assist in 9th minute. However, Chennaiyin quickly equalized via Maílson Alves's header in 17th minute from a corner. Bengaluru FC suffered a double blow as Dimas Delgado had to be substituted just before the half time due to an injury and Maílson Alves scored the second goal just before the half time. Chennaiyin strengthened their lead as Raphael Augusto scored the third goal on the counter. Bengaluru FC's relentless attack in the dying minutes earned them a second goal by Miku, but Chennaiyin held on to the lead and emerged winner. The loss also ended Bengaluru FC's 15 match unbeaten streak across all tournaments and their first loss since their loss against Delhi Dynamos FC in January 2018.

Reacting to the defeat, Albert Roca said:

League stage

Playoffs

Final

Table

Results by matchday

2017 AFC Cup

Inter-zone play-off semi-finals
Bengaluru FC advanced to the inter-zone play-off semi-finals during 2016–17 season. The draw for the Inter-zone play-off semi-finals was held on 6 June 2017. Bengaluru FC was pitted against east Asian zone champions North Korean club April 25. Bengaluru FC kicked off its 2017–18 season with the home game. Bengaluru FC took the lead against North Korean champions in 33rd minute with Sunil Chhetri's penalty. Bengaluru scored two more goals in the second half and took 3–0 lead in the first leg. In the second leg, Bengaluru FC managed to hold April 25 to a goalless draw. The home team was awarded a penalty in 75th minute, however Gurpreet Singh Sandhu guessed it correctly to keep a clean sheet for Bengaluru FC and the team advanced to Inter-zone play-off finals with 3–0 aggregate.

Inter-zone play-off finals
Bengaluru faced Tajik League champions FC Istiklol in the inter-zone play-off finals. In the first leg, Tajik champions got the better of the visitors and secured 1–0 lead with a goal from Dmitry Barkov in the first half. Bengaluru FC's vocal appeals for a penalty in the injury time were denied by the referee and Bengaluru had to be content without an away goal. In the home leg, Bengaluru FC gave away an early goal by conceding 
a penalty and an important away goal to Tajik team. Bengaluru came back twice from behind but could not overcome the deficit and the game ended at 2–2, ending their campaign in 2017 AFC Cup.

2018 AFC Cup

Qualifying play-offs

As the winner of 2016–17 Indian Federation Cup, Bengaluru FC qualified for AFC cup for fourth consecutive time. They faced the 2017 Bhutan National League champions Transport United in the preliminary round. Facing crowded schedule in continental games and domestic league, Bengaluru FC fielded an inexperienced squad in the away leg. Bengaluru FC Academy graduate Prashanth Kalinga made his debut for the senior team. Bengaluru could not capitalize on the chances created and had to settle for a 0–0 draw. However, Bengaluru scored a convincing victory in the home leg, with Boithang Haokip, Daniel Lalhlimpuia, and Thongkhosiem Haokip scoring a goal each.

In the play-off round, Bengaluru FC faced 2017 Dhivehi Premier League runners-up, T.C. Sports Club. Bengaluru traveled to Malé for the first leg with ongoing political crisis in Maldives. The first half remained goalless, but Bengaluru scored two quick goals in the second half to take 0–2 lead with goals from Thongkhosiem Haokip and Erik Paartalu, however defensive lapses allowed TC Sports to score two goals and equalize. However, Thongkhosiem Haokip scored again in 78th minute to snatch 2–3 victories for the visitors. In the home leg, Bengaluru FC secured a dominant 5–0 victory against the visitors as Toni Dovale scored Bengaluru's first ever hat-trick in an Asian tournament, while Erik Paartalu and Rahul Bheke scored other goals.

Preliminary round

Play-off round

Group stage

Bengaluru FC competed in Group E alongside 2016–17 I-League champions Aizawl F.C., 2017 Dhivehi Premier League champions New Radiant S.C., and 2017–18 Bangladesh Premier League champions Dhaka Abahani.

Bengaluru kicked off their campaign against Dhaka Abahani on 14 March 2018. With upcoming Indian Super League final, Roca rested the key players and fielded the reserve side. Daniel Lalhlimpuia's goal in the second half proved sufficient as Bengaluru won the game 1–0. Bengaluru's game against Aizawl F.C. was originally scheduled on the first match day, however it was postponed to 5 April due to scheduling conflicts with Indian Super League and I-League games. Aizawl took the early lead when they capitalized on the defensive lapse of Bengaluru. However, Bengaluru equalized when they were awarded a penalty just before the half-time. Bengaluru made the most of their possession in the second half and scored two more goals, in spite of missing a penalty, and registered 3–1 win. Bengaluru then faced New Radiant S.C. at home on 10 April 2018. Having rested many key players, Bengaluru failed to find many scoring opportunities and Roca was forced introduce Sunil Chhetri late in the second half and that turned out to be significant as Chhetri managed to shake off his marker in the dying minutes and created an assist to Nishu Kumar and Bengaluru won the close game 1–0.

Bengaluru's qualification chances were dealt a blow when they lost 2–0 to New Radiant in the reverse leg. Both the teams being equal on the points, New Radiant topped the group based on their head-to-head record, leaving Bengaluru's qualification dependent on New Radiant's results. Bengaluru stayed in contention for the knockout stage with a convincing 5–0 win against Aizawl F.C. that included a brace from Daniel Segovia. In the final game of the group stage, Bengaluru FC scored a convincing 4–0 victory against Dhaka Abahani, with a brace from the defender Nishu Kumar and goals from Daniel Lucas Segovia and Sunil Chhetri. As New Radiant S.C. failed to overcome Aizawl F.C. on the final match day, Bengaluru advanced to the knock-out stage of the tournament for the fourth consecutive year, played in 2018–19 season.

Group E

Super Cup

As one of the top six teams in Indian Super League, Bengaluru FC qualified for the main round in 2018 Indian Super Cup. Bengaluru FC met the qualifier I-League side, Gokulam Kerala F.C. in Round of 16 match. Determined Gokulam Kerala side took the lead in the first half as Henry Kisekka beat the offside trap to score the goal. Bengaluru's attack in the second half paid off when Miku scored the equalizer from Udanta Singh's assist in the 70th minute. When the game destined to be heading for the extra time, man of the match Udanta Singh scored the goal in the 5th minute of injury time to secure the spot for Bengaluru in quarter-finals. In quarter-finals game, Bengaluru faced another I-League side, NEROCA F.C. Sunil Chhetri scored his second hat-trick of the season to manage a convincing 3–1 victory and set up the semi-final game against their I-League rival, Mohun Bagan A.C. Bengaluru suffered a setback when Mohun Bagan took the lead just before the half-time and Nishu Kumar was sent-off soon after the restart. However, Bengaluru continued the attack and staged a convincing 4–2 comeback that included a hat-trick for Miku.

Final
Bengaluru FC faced yet another I-League side and rival East Bengal F.C. in the final. East Bengal drew the first blood when Ansumana Kromah scored a goal from the corner kick, but East Bengal were reduced to 10-men before the half time when Samad Ali Mallick was sent-off for the violent conduct. Bengaluru dominated the proceedings in the second half as they scored four goals, a brace from Sunil Chhetri and a goal each from Miku and Rahul Bheke, and won the inaugural Super Cup 4–1. Super Cup also marked Bengaluru FC's fifth trophy in as many years.

Management information

Midway through the season, Bengaluru FC parted ways with the assistant coach Carles Cuadrat owing to health concerns. He was replaced by former FC Barcelona youth coach, Marc Huguet.

As of July 2017.

Player statistics

Appearances and goals

|-
! colspan=12 style=background:#dcdcdc; text-align:center| Goalkeepers

|-
! colspan=12 style=background:#dcdcdc; text-align:center| Defenders
|-

|-
! colspan=12 style=background:#dcdcdc; text-align:center| Midfielders
|-

|-
! colspan=12 style=background:#dcdcdc; text-align:center| Forwards
|-

|-
! colspan=12 style=background:#dcdcdc; text-align:center| Players transferred out during the season
|-

Updated: 16 May 2018

Top scorers

Source: soccerway
Updated: 16 May 2018

Clean sheets

Source: soccerway
Updated: 16 May 2018

Disciplinary record

Source: soccerway
Updated: 16 May 2018

Awards

Player of the Month award

Awarded monthly to the player that was chosen by fan voting

Club's Annual Awards
Bengaluru FC’s Annual Awards Night for the 2017–18 season, held at the JW Marriott, in Bengaluru, on 17 May 2018.

FPAI Annual Awards
Football Players Association of India’s Annual Awards for the 2017–18 season, held at the Calkutta Sports Journalist Club, in Kolkata, on 12 June 2018.

Notes

References

See also
 2017–18 in Indian football

Bengaluru FC seasons
2010s in Bangalore
Bengaluru